Stéphane Yvars (born  1970) is a Canadian former competitive figure skater. He is the 1997 Czech Skate champion and a three-time (1995–97) Quebec champion. He trained at CPA Boucherville and at the Mariposa School of Skating, where he was coached by Doug Leigh. He retired from competition due to a knee injury.

As of 2015, Yvars is the head coach at Boucherville Centre Elite. His brothers, Bruno and Thierry, also competed in figure skating.

Competitive highlights 
GP: Champions Series (Grand Prix)

References 

1970 births
Canadian male single skaters
Living people
Figure skaters from Montreal
20th-century Canadian people
21st-century Canadian people